Carlia ailanpalai is a species of skink, commonly known as the curious skink, in the genus Carlia. It is native to  Papua New Guinea. It has been introduced to Weno Island and Guam.

References

Carlia
Reptiles described in 2004
Reptiles of Papua New Guinea
Taxa named by George Robert Zug
Skinks of New Guinea